Durham College Oshawa GO station is a station for commuter rail, passenger rail and regional bus services in Oshawa, Ontario, Canada. It is the terminal station for the Lakeshore East line of GO Transit and serves Via Rail's Corridor service, which travels from Toronto to both Ottawa and Montreal. The bus terminal is served by bus routes of GO Transit and Durham Region Transit.

History

The Grand Trunk Railway between Montreal and Toronto was completed in 1856 and the first Oshawa station was located on the north end of Albert Street. In 1923, the Grand Trunk was absorbed by the Canadian National Railway who, in the 1960s, built a single-floor station with a flat roof west of the original station where the Canadian National Railway yard is now on the north side of the tracks. The building was expanded and upgraded by Via Rail in the early 1990s and GO Transit's Lakeshore East line was extended to there in 1995.

On November 24, 2017, the modernization of the Oshawa GO Station was completed and opened to the public. It was announced two years earlier as a joint project between Via Rail and Metrolinx, the province's public transit agency. The  projects included upgrades to the modern ticketing counter, a waiting area with bigger public washrooms, and a pedestrian bridge to the Via platform which made it easier for drivers, pedestrians and cyclists to access the station.

Via Rail
The station is regularly served by intercity trains on the Corridor routes between Toronto and Montreal or Ottawa. In 2009 Via Rail announced the planned construction of a new fully accessible station adjacent to the existing building as part of major improvements to the Kingston Subdivision, the main line between Toronto and Dorval.

GO Transit

Oshawa is the eastern terminus of GO's Lakeshore East line train service, operating in its own dedicated trackage east of Pickering. This is one of the only two terminal stations in the GO transit system located at the actual end of line trackage, the other one is West Harbour GO Station located in Hamilton, Ontario. 
There are GO bus connections serving Courtice, Bowmanville, Newcastle and Peterborough to the east, and to the west, serving Whitby, Ajax, Pickering, Scarborough and Toronto, via Highway 2 and/or Highway 401.

In October 2022, Oshawa GO station became the first Metrolinx station to enter into a naming partnership agreement. The naming rights of the station was sold to Durham College as part of a 10 year agreement. Subsequently, the station was renamed to Durham College Oshawa GO Station, which will take into effect on the station building itself, maps, and other  assets owned by Metrolinx.  The station is located 30 minutes away by bus from the college's main campus.

GO Transit plans to cease services to the station when it extends services to Bowmanville, replacing it with three new stations (with plans for a future potential fourth station).

Durham Region Transit
Durham Region Transit serves the city of Oshawa and surrounding cities such as Whitby, Port Perry, Ajax, Pickering and Clarington.

DRT tickets pass, and transfers are accepted on GO buses operating within Durham Region, allowing riders to freely transfer between DRT and GO buses to complete a trip within the region. DRT also has in place a co-fare (reduced fare) system for riders transferring from GO Transit.

Connecting bus services
Durham Region Transit
 403 Park
 902 King

GO Transit
 52 - 407 East Bus
 56 - Oshawa/Oakville Bus
 88 - Peterborough/Oshawa Bus
 90 - Lakeshore East Early Morning Bus
 92 - Oshawa/Yorkdale Local Bus
 96 - Oshawa/Finch Express Bus

References

External links

GO Transit railway stations
Railway stations in Oshawa
Via Rail stations in Ontario
Year of establishment missing